Millennium Hilton may refer to:

 Millennium Hilton New York Downtown, a Hilton hotel in lower Manhattan, New York City, United States
 Millennium Hilton New York One UN Plaza
 Millennium Hilton Seoul, a Hilton hotel in Seoul, South Korea